The Violin Sonata No. 1 by Maurice Ravel, known also as Sonate posthume, is the composer's earliest instance of a sonata for this combination of instruments. While composed 30 years before the publication of his second violin sonata, it was published 38 years after his death.

Background 
After being expelled from the Conservatoire de Paris in 1895 due to his ineptitude of piano playing, he was eventually readmitted two years later to study counterpoint under André Gedalge and composition under Gabriel Fauré. The reason for composition is not entirely known, however it is believed that this was composed and performed for Fauré's composition classes.

The piece is a single movement lasting approximately 15 minutes. 

There have also been transcriptions for viola, flute, or soprano saxophone as well as an orchestration of the accompaniment by Jorge Bosso.

References 

Violin sonatas
1897 compositions
Compositions by Maurice Ravel
Compositions in A major